Argyrolopha costibarbata is a moth of the family Noctuidae first described by George Hampson in 1914. It is found in Mauritius and Réunion.

The length of its forewings is about 10 mm.

References

External links
 Picture of Argyrolopha costibarbata on Flickr

Catocalinae
Moths described in 1914
Moths of Mauritius
Moths of Réunion